This list contains quantum processors, also known as quantum processing units (QPUs). Some devices listed below have only been announced at press conferences so far, with no actual demonstrations or scientific publications characterizing the performance.

Quantum processors are difficult to compare due to the different architectures and approaches. Due to this, published qubit numbers do not reflect the performance levels of the processor. This is instead achieved through benchmarking metrics such as Quantum volume, Randomized benchmarking or CLOPS.

Circuit-based quantum processors
These QPUs are based on the quantum circuit and quantum logic gate-based model of computing.

Annealing quantum processors
These QPUs are based on quantum annealing.

Analog quantum processors
These QPUs are based on analog Hamiltonian simulation.

See also
 Quantum programming
 Timeline of quantum computing and communication

References

Quantum computing
quantum processors